Henriette was a French privateer commissioned in Bordeaux in late 1803. She served in the Bay of Biscay until mid-1804, and then in the Indian Ocean, based at Île de France (now Mauritius). The 74-gun HMS Powerful captured her in June 1806 off Ceylon.

French service
Commissioned in late 1803 under Thomas Henry (or Henri), Henriette cruised  in the Bay of Biscay until June 1804. She then crossed to Île de France, where she undertook three cruises, capturing several large British merchantmen.

Henry then embarked on 12 September on the first of two more successful cruises. Apparently some of Henriettes guns, two 12-pounder carronades, came from the East Indiaman , which the French privateer Psyche had captured in January.

On 12 October he captured Faza-Soubany (or Fazzy Soubani), of 500 tons (bm), Fryer, master, sailing from Bombay to Bengal.

Then on 26 October he captured Friendship. Friendship, of two guns and 380 tons, was carrying a cargo of rice, indigo, and cotton.

The next day Henry captured Sha Allum, of two guns and 380 tons (bm). She was carrying pepper, indigo, and cotton. Two days later he captured Marguerite, of two guns and 280 tons (bm). She was carrying sugar, indigo, and cotton.

On 12 November Henry captured James Sybald, of ten guns and 1,000 tons (bm); she had a cargo of rice. (James Sibald had been sailing from Bengal to Bombay. James Sybald resisted and during the course of this resistance Captain Henri received a wound from a "biscaïen", a type of large-caliber musket, that exposed his entrails. Henriette then returned to Port Louis on 10 December.)

Henry and Henriette left on their second cruise on 9 January 1805. On 3 February they captured the East Indiaman . Coromandel was described as being of 450 tons and armed with fourteen 9-pounder guns.

The privateers gave up Robust to their prisoners. She arrived at Bengal on 4 December 1805.

On 17 September 1805 Henry captured Viper, of eight guns and 12 swivel guns. A month later, on 13 November, Henriette captured Phoenix (possibly ), of 600 tons (bm). Henriette returned to Port Louis on 26 March 1806.

In April 1806, command of Henriette passed to Auguste Sagory. Henriette left Port Louis on 7 April, and on 6 May captured Dawetz-Nissaint on 6 May.

Fate
On 13 June  captured Henriette off Trincomalee, Ceylon (now Sri Lanka). Powerful had received intelligence of her presence in the area and set out from Trincomalee on the 11th. Powerful sighted Henriette on the morning of the 13th. After an 11-hour chase, during which Henriette fired her stern guns at Powerful without effect, Powerful succeeded in catching up to her quarry, which surrendered without further combat. During the chase, Henriettes crew had thrown four of her 6-pounder guns overboard in an attempt to lighten her and so gain speed.
 Head money was paid for Henriette in January 1814.

Notes, citations, and references
Notes

Citations

References
 
 
 
 

1800s ships
Captured ships
Maritime incidents in 1806
Privateer ships of France